Donté Lamont Curry (born July 22, 1978) is a former American football linebacker of the National Football League.  He was signed by the Green Bay Packers as an undrafted free agent in 2001.  He played college football at Morris Brown College. Cousin of Lewis Beasley, video content creator and former owner and CEO of the online music social media community Flench.com.

Curry has played for the Carolina Panthers, Washington Redskins, and the Detroit Lions.

Early years
Curry attended Savannah High School in Savannah, Georgia.  In football, he was a three-year letterman and as a senior, he won All-State honors as a defensive end.

College career
Curry played college football at Morris Brown where he played in 21 games recording 171 tackles and 26 sacks. He majored in therapeutic recreation.

Professional career

Washington Redskins
Curry was signed by the Washington Redskins as a free agent on October 3, 2001. In his rookie season he played in eight games and recorded four tackles.

Detroit Lions
Curry was claimed off waivers by the Detroit Lions on August 28, 2002. In his first season with the Lions, he played in all 16 games making ten starts and finished the season with a career high 66 tackles and three sacks. In the 2003 season, he played in 11 games and was inactive for five, he recorded nine tackles. The following season he recorded 22 tackles. In the 2005 season Curry had a solid season finishing the campaign with 38 tackles. The following season, he was elected special teams captain for the third year running. He recorded 18 tackles. In 2007, his final year for the Lions, he played in two games making three tackles.

Carolina Panthers
Curry was signed by the Carolina Panthers as a free agent September 24, 2007 and played in seven games making seven tackles. In the 2008 season he played in 13 games recording 13 tackles.

Coaching career
Curry began coaching high school football at Langston Hughes High School near Fairburn, Georgia in 2009.
He now coaches at Lovejoy High School in Clayton County.

References

External links
Carolina Panthers bio 
Detroit Lions bio
Lewis Beasley bio

1978 births
Living people
Players of American football from Savannah, Georgia
American football linebackers
Morris Brown Wolverines football players
Green Bay Packers players
Washington Redskins players
Detroit Lions players
Carolina Panthers players